Hyalinobatrachium guairarepanense is a species of frog in the family Centrolenidae.

Its natural habitats are seasonal (semi-deciduous) forests where it occurs along streams. The eggs are laid on leaves overhanging a stream to which the hatched larvae drop and where they continue their development. It is threatened by habitat loss. However, it has declined also in pristine habitats, suggesting that chytridiomycosis (or other disease) may be at play. Its range includes the El Ávila National Park and the Macarao National Park.

References

guairarepanense
Endemic fauna of Venezuela
Amphibians of Venezuela
Amphibians described in 2001
Taxa named by Josefa Celsa Señaris
Taxonomy articles created by Polbot